Florence Kasumba (born 26 October 1976) is a Ugandan-born German actress.  She is best known for her portrayal of Ayo in the Marvel Cinematic Universe films Captain America: Civil War (2016), Black Panther (2018), Avengers: Infinity War (2018), and Black Panther: Wakanda Forever (2022), as well as the Disney+ series The Falcon and the Winter Soldier (2021). She is also known for her acting in German and Dutch films. She also played Senator Acantha in Wonder Woman (2017), Shenzi in The Lion King (2019), and the Wicked Witch of the East in the NBC television series Emerald City (2017).

Early life
Florence Kasumba was born on 26 October 1976 in Kampala, Uganda. She spent her childhood in Essen, Germany, where she attended elementary school and high school. After watching the musical Starlight Express at the age of 12, she was inspired to become a performer. She earned her degree in acting, singing, and dancing from Fontys University of Applied Sciences in Tilburg, the Netherlands. Kasumba is fluent in German, English, and Dutch. She resides in Berlin, Germany.

Career
While she was still studying in college, Kasumba landed her first professional film role, Silke, in the Dutch motion picture hit Ik ook van jou. After graduating from college, she performed in many musicals, such as Chicago, The Lion King, Cats, West Side Story, Evita, and Beauty and the Beast. Florence Kasumba travelled to New York City and was cast in the title role in Germany's premiere production of Elton John's international hit musical Aida. She also played Lisa in Germany's premiere cast of Mamma Mia.

Kasumba has appeared in a variety of Dutch, German and English language films and television series.

Kasumba made her Marvel Cinematic Universe debut in the 2016 film Captain America: Civil War. Her role was credited as a security guard for Black Panther, and she received widespread praise for her brief scene in which she threatens Black Widow by ordering her to "Move or you will be moved." Kasumba reprised the character, Ayo, a member of the all-female Dora Milaje fighting squad, in the Black Panther solo film, Avengers: Infinity War, and the streaming series The Falcon and the Winter Soldier.

She played Senator Acantha in 2017's Wonder Woman and the Wicked Witch of the East in the NBC television series Emerald City. She splits her time between U.S. and German film and TV productions.

In 2019, Kasumba landed the character of Shenzi in the computer-animated remake, The Lion King (2019) directed by Jon Favreau, alongside Keegan-Michael Key and Eric André as Kamari and Azizi.

Awards and nominations
She was nominated for the Black Entertainment Film Fashion Television & Arts Award for International Rising Star in 2016, against Lupita Nyong'o, John Boyega and Lisa Awuku. Kasumba appeared alongside Nyong'o in Black Panther.

Filmography

Film

Television

References

External links 
 
 Official Website
 Florence Kasumba at the German Dubbing Card Index

1976 births
Living people
German film actresses
German television actresses
People from Kampala
Ugandan emigrants to Germany
Ugandan film actresses
Ugandan television actresses
21st-century German actresses
21st-century Ugandan actresses